Stephen Armstrong (born 23 July 1976 in Birkenhead) is an English-born South African former footballer who spent the majority of his career with clubs in the United States.

Career

College and amateur
Armstrong was born in Birkenhead, England and raised in Cape Town, South Africa. He came to the United States to attend Butler University in Indiana and finished as the school's third all-time leading scorer with 43 goals and 16 assists. During his college career Armstrong also played for the Mid-Michigan Bucks in the Premier Development League.

Professional
Armstrong was selected in the second round – 13th overall – of the 2000 MLS SuperDraft by D.C. United but he decided to begin his professional career in Sweden with Västra Frölunda instead before moving to English First Division side Watford on a free transfer in October 2000. He made three appearances for the club, all as a substitute, before being released at the end of the 2000–01 season.

He eventually returned to play for D.C. United, sixteen-months after the draft. Armstrong was traded to Kansas City for Brandon Prideaux on 11 January 2002. He spent two years with the Wizards, appearing in regular season and playoff  each year.

Armstrong missed the 2004 Major League Soccer season while recovering from ACL surgery on his right knee. He joined the Columbus Crew in 2005. At the beginning of the 2006 season Armstrong signed with A-League club Charleston Battery, where he would spend the remainder of his outdoor career, and served as an assistant coach during his final season with the club.

Honors

Charleston Battery
USL Second Division Champions (1): 2010
USL Second Division Regular Season Champions (1): 2010

Personal
2006–2007 MISL Rookie of the Year

References

External links
 Charleston Battery bio
 
 
 

1976 births
Living people
People from Birkenhead
Butler Bulldogs men's soccer players
Charleston Battery players
Chicago Storm (MISL) players
Columbus Crew players
D.C. United players
Expatriate soccer players in the United States
English footballers
English people of Scottish descent
English sportspeople of South African descent
Association football forwards
Major League Soccer players
Flint City Bucks players
Naturalised citizens of South Africa
South African soccer players
South African people of English descent
South African people of Scottish descent
Sporting Kansas City players
English Football League players
USL First Division players
USL League Two players
USL Second Division players
USL Championship players
Västra Frölunda IF players
Watford F.C. players
White South African people
D.C. United draft picks
English expatriate sportspeople in the United States
English expatriate footballers
Allsvenskan players